Gorgab (also Romanized as Gorgāb; also known as Gurgāb, and Gurgāb Karīmābād) is a city in Borkhar-e Gharbi Rural District, in the Central District of Shahin Shahr and Meymeh County, Isfahan Province, Iran. At the 2006 census, its population was 4,859, in 1,252 families.

References 

Populated places in Shahin Shahr and Meymeh County